The 2018–19 Wyoming Cowgirls basketball team will represent the University of Wyoming in the 2018–19 college basketball season. The Cowgirls are led by head coach Joe Legerski in his 16th and final season. The Cowgirls will play their home games at the Arena-Auditorium and were members of the Mountain West Conference. They finished the season 25–9, 13–5 in Mountain West play to finish in third place. They advanced to the championship game of the Mountain West tournament where they lost to Boise. They received an at-large to the 2019 Women's National Invitation Tournament where they defeated Northern Colorado, South Alabama and Pepperdine in the first, second and third rounds before losing to Arizona in the quarterfinals.

Roster

Statistics

Schedule

|-
!colspan=9 style="background:#492f24; color:#ffc425;"| Exhibition

|-
!colspan=9 style="background:#492f24; color:#ffc425;"| Non–Conference regular season

|-
!colspan=9 style="background:#492f24; color:#ffc425;"| Mountain West regular season

|-
!colspan=9 style="background:#492f24; color:#ffc425;"| Mountain West Women's Tournament

|-
!colspan=9 style="background:#492f24; color:#ffc425;"|WNIT

See also
 2018–19 Wyoming Cowboys basketball team

References

Wyoming Cowgirls basketball seasons
Wyoming
Wyoming Cowgirls
Wyoming Cowgirls
Wyoming